Slasher is a Canadian horror anthology television series created by Aaron Martin which premiered on March 4, 2016 on Chiller. The series' licensing rights were purchased by Netflix in January 2017 and the following seasons were released  exclusively via Netflix's web streaming service. The second season was released on October 17, 2017. In November 2020, the series was moved to Shudder for a fourth season.

Series overview

Episodes

Season 1: The Executioner (2016)

Season 2: Guilty Party (2017)

Season 3: Solstice (2019)

Season 4: Flesh & Blood (2021)

References

External links

 
 

Slasher